is a series of four compilation albums by Japanese entertainer Miho Nakayama, released through King Records on March 7, 2001. Each enhanced CD uses a soap bar motif for the cover and includes a music video of the last track of the disc.

Your Selection 1 
Your Selection 1 compiles Nakayama's eight most popular songs, as voted on her homepage in late-2000, plus the singles "Love Clover" and "A Place Under the Sun". The album peaked at No. 28 on Oricon's albums chart and sold over 9,000 copies.

Track listing

Charts

Your Selection 2 
Your Selection 2 consists of the 10 most popular B-sides, as voted by fans. The album peaked at No. 62 on Oricon's albums chart and sold over 5,000 copies.

Track listing

Charts

Your Selection 3 
Your Selection 3 features the 10 most popular non-single songs, as voted by fans. The album peaked at No. 67 on Oricon's albums chart and sold over 4,000 copies.

Track listing

Charts

Your Selection 4 
Your Selection 4 features select tracks from Mid Blue, Deep Lip French, Groovin' Blue, and Olive. The album peaked at No. 68 on Oricon's albums chart and sold over 4,000 copies.

Track listing

Charts

References

External links
Your Selection 1
 
 

Your Selection 2
 
 

Your Selection 3
 
 

Your Selection 4
 
 

2001 compilation albums
Miho Nakayama compilation albums
Japanese-language compilation albums
King Records (Japan) compilation albums